Lucas Silva dos Santos (born 19 February 1997), commonly known as Lucas Silva, is a Brazilian professional footballer who plays for Portuguese club Amora as a defender.

Career statistics

Club

Notes

References

1997 births
Living people
Brazilian footballers
Association football defenders
CR Vasco da Gama players
Associação Atlética Flamengo players
Académico de Viseu F.C. players
G.D. Estoril Praia players
Amora F.C. players
Liga Portugal 2 players
Brazilian expatriate footballers
Brazilian expatriate sportspeople in Portugal
Expatriate footballers in Portugal
People from Barra Mansa